Qəhrəmanlı or Kagramanli may refer to:
 Kagramanly, Azerbaijan
 Kəhrəmanlı, Azerbaijan
 Qəhrəmanlı, Barda, Azerbaijan
 Qəhrəmanlı, Beylagan, Azerbaijan